The Pewee Coal is a geologic formation in Tennessee. It preserves fossils dating back to the Carboniferous period.

See also

 List of fossiliferous stratigraphic units in Tennessee
 Paleontology in Tennessee

References
 

Carboniferous geology of Tennessee